Menegola is a surname. Notable people with the surname include:

Sam Menegola (born 1992), Australian rules footballer 
Todd Menegola (born 1967), Australian rules footballer